Brighty Balachandran, better known by her stage name Mythili, is an Indian actress who appears in Malayalam films. She made her debut in the 2009 Malayalam film Paleri Manikyam: Oru Pathirakolapathakathinte Katha which stars Mammootty in lead role.

Early life 

Mythili was born Brighty Balachandran in Konni, Pathanamthitta in Kerala, India. Her father is Balachandran, an accountant and mother Beena, she has a brother named Bibin. Mythili married to Sampath on 28 April 2022 who works as an Architect.

She did her schooling till the seventh grade at St. Mary's High School, Eliyarackal, Konni and later in Amrita VHSS, Konni, and her higher secondary education was at Government HSS, Konni. She studied flight attendant course and has a degree in Bachelor of Commerce. She is also a trained classical dancer.

Career
She debuted in Ranjith's crime drama film Paleri Manikyam: Oru Pathirakolapathakathinte Katha. She acted in Salt N' Pepper which subsequently earned her a nomination for Best Supporting Actress at 59th Filmfare Awards South. She made her playback singing debut with Malayalam thriller Loham (The Yellow Metal).

Filmography

Television

References

External links 
 

People from Pathanamthitta district
Actresses from Kerala
Year of birth missing (living people)
Living people
Actresses in Malayalam cinema
Indian film actresses
21st-century Indian actresses